Mukhair Al-Rashidi (born 20 May 1999) is a Saudi Arabian professional footballer who plays as a right back for Pro League club Al-Fayha.

Career
Al-Rashidi started his career in the youth teams of Al-Sawari. On 28 July 2017, Al-Rashidi joined Al-Fayha. He made his first-team debut on 6 January 2018 by starting the King Cup Round of 32 match against Al-Qaisumah. He made his league debut by coming off the bench against Al-Nassr on 11 January 2018. On 12 July 2019, Al-Rashidi signed his first professional contract with Al-Fayha. He signed a 3-year contract with the option to extend for a further 2 years. Al-Rashidi scored his first goal for the club on 14 December 2019 in a 2–1 loss against Damac.

Honours

Club
Al-Fayha
King Cup: 2021–22

International
Saudi Arabia U20
 AFC U-19 Championship: 2018

References

External links
 

1999 births
Living people
People from Jizan Province
Saudi Arabian footballers
Association football defenders
Saudi Arabia youth international footballers
Saudi Professional League players
Saudi First Division League players
Al-Sawari Club players
Al-Fayha FC players